Ransome is the surname of:

Arthur Ransome (1884–1967), English author and journalist
Ernest L. Ransome (1852–1917), Anglo-American architect and concrete engineer
Frederick Ransome (1818–1893), British inventor of artificial stone
Frederick Leslie Ransome (1868–1934), English-American geologist
 Gordon Arthur Ransome (1910-1977), Professor of Medicine, First Master of the Academy of Medicine, Singapore.
James Ransome (manufacturer) (1782–1849), British agricultural machinery manufacturer, son of Robert Ransome
James Ransome (illustrator), American illustrator of children's books
James Allen Ransome (1806–1875), British agricultural machinery manufacturer and writer, grandson of Robert Ransome
Prunella Ransome (1943–2002), English actress
Robert Ransome (1753–1830), British founder of an agricultural machinery maker

See also
Ransom (surname)
Ransome-Kuti family, an influential Nigerian family